This is a list of the emblemns and flags of the subdivisions of Albania, including the counties (first-level subdivisions), and the municipalities (second-level subdivisions).

Counties

Emblems

Flags

Municipalities

Emblems

Flags 

subdivisions
subdivisions
Albania
Albania
Subdivisions of Albania
Counties of Albania
Municipalities of Albania